Lists of member states of the European Union provide different types of information about each of the states in the European Union. They include lists about politics, demographics and economics.

General

 Member state of the European Union, including a list of all member states
 List of European Union member states by political system
 List of European Union member states by population

Economics

 List of European Union member states by GDP growth
 List of European Union member states by average wage
 List of European Union member states by health expense per person
 List of European Union member states by minimum wage
 List of European Union member states by unemployment rate

See also

 List of sovereign states in Europe by GDP (nominal)
 List of sovereign states and dependent territories in Europe by GDP (PPP)

Member states